Cici or CICI may refer to:

Persons with the name 
 CiCi Bellis, American tennis player
 Cici Hong Chen, Chinese singer
 Cici Manolache, Romanian footballer

Other uses 
 Ćići, the people of the Ćićarija region in Croatia and Slovenia
 Çiçi, a village in Azerbaijan 
 Chemotherapy-induced cognitive impairment, a side effect of some cancer treatments
 CiCi's Pizza, a pizza and buffet chain
 CICI-TV, Canadian TV station
 Cici, a character in the British television programme Roary the Racing Car

See also 
 Ceci